Anton Elfinger (15 January 1821 – 19 January 1864) was an Austrian physician and illustrator. 

Son of a pharmacist in Vienna, he trained at the Academy of Fine Arts Vienna, where he was a student of Leopold Kupelwieser (1796-1862). He later studied medicine, earning his medical doctorate in 1845.

Afterwards he was an assistant to dermatologist Ferdinand von Hebra (1816–1880) in Vienna. From 1849 until 1858, he was an illustrator of medical technical literature. He was acclaimed for his skillful artistry, in particular the artwork in Hebra's Atlas der Hautkrankheiten (Atlas of Skin Diseases), of which he shared the artistic duties with Carl Heitzmann (1836–1896).

Elfinger was also a highly regarded cartoonist, and published his work under the pseudonym "Cajetan". His illustrations consisted of a wide array of subjects, including political cartoons.

Further reading 
 Cajetan das Leben des Wiener Mediziners und Karikaturisten Dr. Anton Elfinger by Margarethe Poch-Kalous (1966).

References
 Anton Elfinger Springermedizin Anton Elfinger, biographical information

Medical illustrators
Austrian illustrators
Austrian cartoonists
Austrian physicians
1821 births
1864 deaths
Academy of Fine Arts Vienna alumni